The Haudagain Roundabout  is a roundabout in Aberdeen that bisects the A92 and A96.   

As all traffic going northbound to Inverness via the A96 or southbound to Dundee via the A92 must pass through this roundabout it is a notoriously busy and hazardous junction with large queues approaching all directions to the roundabout, especially during rush hour. It has been referred to as 'Scotland's worst roundabout'.

The construction of Aberdeen Western Peripheral Route is aimed at reducing the congestion due to traffic passing through Aberdeen. In addition improvements are planned to help ease the congestion at the roundabout.

Bypass
Following an evaluation of various options for improving traffic flow at the roundabout, a bypass to the south-west of the roundabout, linking the A92 and the A96, was selected. In 2008, this was expected to cost £14.5 million. The project required 127 flats to be demolished, this occurred in 2018. In December 2019, Farrans Construction was appointed as contractor for the project. The cost has risen to at least £17.6 million. In January 2020, the project cost was quoted as £49.5 million.

The project was originally expected to be completed by spring 2021, however this was pushed back to winter 2021. It finally opened on 16 May 2022.

References

Roundabouts in Scotland
Transport in Aberdeen